Chenggong Reservoir, also known as Chengkung Reservoir, Cheng Kung Reservoir, is a reservoir on the Penghu Islands, located in Chenggong Village, Huxi Township, Penghu County, Taiwan.

The construction of Chenggong Reservoir started in October 1972, and was completed in December 1973. As of April 1, 2021, the reservoir has a total storage capacity of 1.21 million cubic meters and an effective capacity of 1.21 million cubic meters. It is the biggest and the oldest reservoir in Penghu County.

See also
 List of dams and reservoirs in Taiwan

References

Reservoirs in Taiwan
Geography of Penghu County
Buildings and structures in Taiwan
Buildings and structures completed in 1973